Wightmans Grove is a census-designated place in Sandusky County, in the U.S. state of Ohio. Its population was 72 as of the 2010 census.

Demographics

History
Wightmans Grove had its start as a summer resort owned by Thelismer O. Wightman.

References

Unincorporated communities in Sandusky County, Ohio
Unincorporated communities in Ohio